The following is the list of the defunct newspapers published in Turkey. (Only those disestablished in the  Republican era)

Turkey history-related lists

Turkey